Orchidaceae is a family of flowering plants (anthophytes) in the order Asparagales .

23,420 species of vascular plant have been recorded in South Africa, making it the sixth most species-rich country in the world and the most species-rich country on the African continent. Of these, 153 species are considered to be threatened. Nine biomes have been described in South Africa: Fynbos, Succulent Karoo, desert, Nama Karoo, grassland, savanna, Albany thickets, the Indian Ocean coastal belt, and forests.

The 2018 South African National Biodiversity Institute's National Biodiversity Assessment plant checklist lists 35,130 taxa in the phyla Anthocerotophyta (hornworts (6)), Anthophyta (flowering plants (33534)), Bryophyta (mosses (685)), Cycadophyta (cycads (42)), Lycopodiophyta (Lycophytes(45)), Marchantiophyta (liverworts (376)), Pinophyta (conifers (33)), and Pteridophyta (cryptogams (408)).

67 genera are represented in the literature. Listed taxa include species, subspecies, varieties, and forms as recorded, some of which have subsequently been allocated to other taxa as synonyms, in which cases the accepted taxon is appended to the listing. Multiple entries under alternative names reflect taxonomic revision over time.

Acampe 
Genus Acampe:
 Acampe pachyglossa Rchb.f. indigenous
 Acampe praemorsa (Roxb.) Blatt. & McCann, accepted as Acampe pachyglossa Rchb.f. indigenous

Acrolophia 
Genus Acrolophia: 
 Acrolophia barbata (Thunb.) H.P.Linder, accepted as Acrolophia lunata (Schltr.) Schltr. & Bolus, endemic
 Acrolophia bolusii Rolfe, endemic
 Acrolophia capensis (P.J.Bergius) Fourc. endemic
 Acrolophia capensis (P.J.Bergius) Fourc. var. lamellata (Lindl.) Schelpe, accepted as Acrolophia lamellata (Lindl.) Pfitzer, indigenous
 Acrolophia cochlearis (Lindl.) Schltr. & Bolus, endemic
 Acrolophia comosa (Sond.) Schltr. & Bolus, accepted as Acrolophia capensis (P.J.Bergius) Fourc. indigenous
 Acrolophia fimbriata Schltr. accepted as Acrolophia micrantha (Lindl.) Pfitzer, indigenous
 Acrolophia lamellata (Lindl.) Pfitzer, endemic
 Acrolophia lunata (Schltr.) Schltr. & Bolus, endemic
 Acrolophia micrantha (Lindl.) Pfitzer, endemic
 Acrolophia parvula Schltr. accepted as Acrolophia ustulata (Bolus) Schltr. & Bolus, indigenous
 Acrolophia sphaerocarpa (Sond.) Schltr. & Bolus, accepted as Acrolophia capensis (P.J.Bergius) Fourc. indigenous
 Acrolophia triste (L.f.) Schltr. & Bolus, accepted as Acrolophia capensis (P.J.Bergius) Fourc. indigenous
 Acrolophia ustulata (Bolus) Schltr. & Bolus, endemic

Aerangis 
Genus Aerangis:
 Aerangis kirkii (Rchb.f.) Schltr. indigenous
 Aerangis mystacidii (Rchb.f.) Schltr. indigenous
 Aerangis somalensis (Schltr.) Schltr. indigenous
 Aerangis verdickii (De Wild.) Schltr. indigenous
 Aerangis verdickii (De Wild.) Schltr. var. verdickii, indigenous

Aeranthes 
Genus Aeranthes:
 Aeranthes gracilis (Harv.) Rchb.f. accepted as Mystacidium gracile Harv. indigenous

Angraecum 
Genus Angraecum:
 Angraecum aphyllum Thouars, accepted as Microcoelia aphylla (Thouars) Summerh. indigenous
 Angraecum chamaeanthus Schltr. indigenous
 Angraecum conchiferum Lindl. indigenous
 Angraecum cultriforme Summerh. indigenous
 Angraecum pusillum Lindl. indigenous
 Angraecum sacciferum Lindl. indigenous
 Angraecum stella-africae P.J.Cribb, indigenous

Ansellia 
Genus Ansellia:
 Ansellia africana Lindl. indigenous

Bartholina 
Genus Bartholina:
 Bartholina burmanniana (L.) Ker Gawl. endemic
 Bartholina etheliae Bolus, indigenous

Bolusiella 
Genus Bolusiella:
 Bolusiella maudiae (Bolus) Schltr. indigenous

Bonatea 
Genus Bonatea:
 Bonatea bracteata G.J.McDonald & McMurtry, accepted as Habenaria transvaalensis Schltr. endemic
 Bonatea cassidea Sond. indigenous
 Bonatea lamprophylla J.L.Stewart, endemic
 Bonatea polypodantha (Rchb.f.) L.Bolus, indigenous
 Bonatea porrecta (Bolus) Summerh. indigenous
 Bonatea pulchella Summerh. indigenous
 Bonatea saundersiae (Harv.) T.Durand & Schinz, accepted as Bonatea cassidea Sond.
 Bonatea saundersioides (Kraenzl. & Schltr.) Cortesi, indigenous
 Bonatea speciosa (L.f.) Willd. indigenous
 Bonatea speciosa (L.f.) Willd. var. antennifera (Rolfe) Sommerv. accepted as Bonatea antennifera Rolfe, indigenous
 Bonatea steudneri (Rchb.f.) T.Durand & Schinz, indigenous

Brachycorythis 
Genus Brachycorythis:
 Brachycorythis conica (Summerh.) Summerh. indigenous
 Brachycorythis conica (Summerh.) Summerh. subsp. transvaalensis Summerh. endemic
 Brachycorythis inhambanensis (Schltr.) Schltr. endemic
 Brachycorythis macowaniana Rchb.f. endemic
 Brachycorythis ovata Lindl. indigenous
 Brachycorythis ovata Lindl. subsp. ovata, indigenous
 Brachycorythis pleistophylla Rchb.f. indigenous
 Brachycorythis pleistophylla Rchb.f. subsp. pleistophylla, indigenous
 Brachycorythis pubescens Harv. indigenous
 Brachycorythis tenuior Rchb.f. indigenous

Brownleea 
Genus Brownleea:
 Brownleea coerulea Harv. ex Lindl. indigenous
 Brownleea galpinii Bolus, indigenous
 Brownleea galpinii Bolus subsp. galpinii, indigenous
 Brownleea galpinii Bolus subsp. major (Bolus) H.P.Linder, indigenous
 Brownleea graminicola McMurtry, indigenous
 Brownleea macroceras Sond. indigenous
 Brownleea parviflora Harv. ex Lindl. indigenous
 Brownleea recurvata Sond. endemic

Bulbophyllum 
Genus Bulbophyllum:
 Bulbophyllum elliotii Rolfe, indigenous
 Bulbophyllum longiflorum Thouars, indigenous
 Bulbophyllum malawiense Morris, accepted as Bulbophyllum elliotii Rolfe
 Bulbophyllum sandersonii (Hook.f.) Rchb.f. indigenous
 Bulbophyllum sandersonii (Hook.f.) Rchb.f. subsp. sandersonii, indigenous
 Bulbophyllum scaberulum (Rolfe) Bolus, indigenous
 Bulbophyllum scaberulum (Rolfe) Bolus var. scaberulum, indigenous

Calanthe 
Genus Calanthe:
 Calanthe sylvatica (Thouars) Lindl. indigenous

Centrostigma 
Genus Centrostigma:
 Centrostigma occultans (Welw. ex Rchb.f.) Schltr. indigenous

Ceratandra 
Genus Ceratandra:
 Ceratandra atrata (L.) T.Durand & Schinz, endemic
 Ceratandra bicolor Sond. ex Bolus, endemic
 Ceratandra globosa Lindl. endemic
 Ceratandra grandiflora Lindl. endemic
 Ceratandra harveyana Lindl. endemic
 Ceratandra venosa (Lindl.) Schltr. endemic

Cheirostylis 
Genus Cheirostylis:
 Cheirostylis gymnochiloides (Ridl.) Rchb.f. accepted as Cheirostylis nuda (Thouars) Ormerod, indigenous
 Cheirostylis nuda (Thouars) Ormerod, indigenous

Cirrhopetalum 
Genus Cirrhopetalum:
 Cirrhopetalum umbellatum (G.Forst.) Hook. & Arn. accepted as Bulbophyllum longiflorum Thouars

Corycium 
Genus Corycium:
 Corycium alticola Parkman & Schelpe, accepted as Pterygodium alticola (Parkman & Schelpe) J.C.Manning & Goldblatt, indigenous
 Corycium bicolorum (Thunb.) Sw. accepted as Pterygodium bicolorum (Thunb.) Schltr. endemic
 Corycium bifidum Sond. accepted as Pterygodium bifidum (Sond.) Schltr. endemic
 Corycium carnosum (Lindl.) Rolfe, accepted as Evotella carnosa (Lindl.) J.C.Manning & Goldblatt, endemic
 Corycium crispum (Thunb.) Sw. accepted as Pterygodium crispum (Thunb.) Schltr. endemic
 Corycium deflexum (Bolus) Rolfe, accepted as Pterygodium deflexum Bolus, endemic
 Corycium dracomontanum Parkman & Schelpe, accepted as Pterygodium dracomontanum (Parkman & Schelpe) J.C.Manning & Goldblatt, indigenous
 Corycium excisum Lindl. accepted as Pterygodium excisum (Lindl.) Schltr. endemic
 Corycium flanaganii (Bolus) Kurzweil & H.P.Linder, accepted as Pterygodium flanaganii Bolus, indigenous
 Corycium ingeanum E.G.H.Oliv. accepted as Pterygodium ingeanum (E.G.H.Oliv.) J.C.Manning & Goldblatt, endemic
 Corycium microglossum Lindl. accepted as Pterygodium microglossum (Lindl.) Schltr. endemic
 Corycium nigrescens Sond. accepted as Pterygodium nigrescens (Sond.) Schltr. indigenous
 Corycium orobanchoides (L.f.) Sw. accepted as Pterygodium orobanchoides (L.f.) Schltr. endemic
 Corycium tricuspidatum Bolus, accepted as Pterygodium tricuspidatum (Bolus) Schltr. indigenous

Corymborkis 
Genus Corymborkis:
 Corymborkis corymbis Thouars, indigenous

Cymbidium 
Genus Cymbidium:
 Cymbidium aculeatum (L.f.) Sw. accepted as Orthochilus aculeatus (L.f.) Bytebier, indigenous
 Cymbidium adenoglossum Lindl. accepted as Orthochilus adenoglossus (Lindl.) Bytebier, indigenous
 Cymbidium ustulatum Bolus, accepted as Acrolophia ustulata (Bolus) Schltr. & Bolus, indigenous

Cynorkis 
Genus Cynorkis:
 Cynorkis compacta (Rchb.f.) Rolfe, endemic
 Cynorkis kassneriana Kraenzl. indigenous

Cyrtorchis 
Genus Cyrtorchis:
 Cyrtorchis arcuata (Lindl.) Schltr. indigenous
 Cyrtorchis arcuata (Lindl.) Schltr. subsp. arcuata, indigenous
 Cyrtorchis praetermissa Summerh. indigenous
 Cyrtorchis praetermissa Summerh. subsp. praetermissa, indigenous
 Cyrtorchis praetermissa Summerh. subsp. zuluensis (E.R.Harrison) H.P.Linder, endemic

Diaphananthe 
Genus Diaphananthe:
 Diaphananthe caffra (Bolus) H.P.Linder, accepted as Margelliantha caffra (Bolus) P.J.Cribb & J.Stewart, endemic
 Diaphananthe fragrantissima (Rchb.f.) Schltr. indigenous
 Diaphananthe millarii (Bolus) H.P.Linder, endemic
 Diaphananthe xanthopollinia (Rchb.f.) Summerh. accepted as Rhipidoglossum xanthopollinium (Rchb.f.) Schltr. endemic

Didymoplexis 
Genus Didymoplexis: 
 Didymoplexis verrucosa J.Stewart & Hennessy, endemic

Disa 
Genus Disa:
 Disa aconitoides Sond. indigenous
 Disa aconitoides Sond. subsp. aconitoides, indigenous
 Disa albomagentea E.G.H.Oliv. & Liltved, indigenous
 Disa alticola H.P.Linder, endemic
 Disa amoena H.P.Linder, endemic
 Disa arida Vlok, endemic
 Disa aristata H.P.Linder, endemic
 Disa atricapilla (Harv. ex Lindl.) Bolus, endemic
 Disa atrorubens Schltr. endemic
 Disa aurata (Bolus) L.T.Parker & Koop. endemic
 Disa barbata (L.f.) Sw. endemic
 Disa basutorum Schltr. indigenous
 Disa baurii Bolus, indigenous
 Disa begleyi L.Bolus, endemic
 Disa bifida (Thunb.) Sw. endemic
 Disa biflora (L.) Druce, indigenous
 Disa bivalvata (L.f.) T.Durand & Schinz, endemic
 Disa bodkinii Bolus, endemic
 Disa bolusiana Schltr. endemic
 Disa brachyceras Lindl. endemic
 Disa bracteata Sw. endemic
 Disa brevicornis (Lindl.) Bolus, indigenous
 Disa brevipetala H.P.Linder, endemic
 Disa caffra Bolus, indigenous
 Disa cardinalis H.P.Linder, endemic
 Disa caulescens Lindl. endemic
 Disa cedarbergensis H.P.Linder, endemic
 Disa cephalotes Rchb.f. indigenous
 Disa cephalotes Rchb.f. subsp. cephalotes, indigenous
 Disa cephalotes Rchb.f. subsp. frigida (Schltr.) H.P.Linder, indigenous
 Disa cernua (Thunb.) Sw. endemic
 Disa chrysostachya Sw. indigenous
 Disa clavicornis H.P.Linder, endemic
 Disa cochlearis S.D.Johnson & Liltved, endemic
 Disa comosa (Rchb.f.) Schltr. endemic
 Disa conferta Bolus, endemic
 Disa cooperi Rchb.f. indigenous
 Disa cornuta (L.) Sw. indigenous
 Disa crassicornis Lindl. indigenous
 Disa cylindrica (Thunb.) Sw. endemic
 Disa densiflora (Lindl.) Bolus, endemic
 Disa dracomontana Schelpe ex H.P.Linder, endemic
 Disa draconis (L.f.) Sw. endemic
 Disa ecalcarata (G.J.Lewis) H.P.Linder, endemic
 Disa elegans Sond. ex Rchb.f. endemic
 Disa esterhuyseniae Schelpe ex H.P.Linder, endemic
 Disa extinctoria Rchb.f. indigenous
 Disa fasciata Lindl. endemic
 Disa ferruginea (Thunb.) Sw. endemic
 Disa filicornis (L.f.) Thunb. endemic
 Disa flexuosa (L.) Sw. endemic
 Disa forcipata Schltr. endemic
 Disa forficaria Bolus, endemic
 Disa fragrans Schltr. indigenous
 Disa fragrans Schltr. subsp. fragrans, indigenous
 Disa galpinii Rolfe, endemic
 Disa gladioliflora Burch. ex Lindl. indigenous
 Disa gladioliflora Burch. ex Lindl. subsp. capricornis (Rchb.f.) H.P.Linder, endemic
 Disa gladioliflora Burch. ex Lindl. subsp. gladioliflora, endemic
 Disa glandulosa Burch. ex Lindl. endemic
 Disa graminifolia Ker Gawl. ex Spreng. endemic
 Disa hallackii Rolfe, endemic
 Disa harveiana Lindl. indigenous
 Disa harveiana Lindl. subsp. harveiana, endemic
 Disa harveiana Lindl. subsp. longicalcarata S.D.Johnson & H.P.Linder, endemic
 Disa hians (L.f.) Spreng. endemic
 Disa hircicornis Rchb.f. indigenous
 Disa inflexa (Lindl.) Bolus, endemic
 Disa introrsa Kurzweil, Liltved & H.P.Linder, endemic
 Disa karooica S.D.Johnson & H.P.Linder, endemic
 Disa klugei McMurtry, endemic
 Disa linderiana Bytebier & E.G.H.Oliv. endemic
 Disa lineata Bolus, endemic
 Disa longicornu L.f. endemic
 Disa longifolia Lindl. endemic
 Disa longipetala (Lindl.) Bolus, endemic
 Disa lugens Bolus, indigenous
 Disa lugens Bolus var. lugens, endemic
 Disa lugens Bolus var. nigrescens (H.P.Linder) H.P.Linder, endemic
 Disa macrostachya (Lindl.) Bolus, endemic
 Disa maculata L.f. endemic
 Disa maculomarronina McMurtry, endemic
 Disa marlothii Bolus, endemic
 Disa micropetala Schltr. endemic
 Disa minor (Sond.) Rchb.f. endemic
 Disa montana Sond. endemic
 Disa multifida Lindl. endemic
 Disa neglecta Sond. endemic
 Disa nervosa Lindl. indigenous
 Disa newdigateae L.Bolus, endemic
 Disa nivea H.P.Linder, indigenous
 Disa nubigena H.P.Linder, endemic
 Disa obliqua (Lindl.) Bolus, endemic
 Disa obliqua (Lindl.) Bolus subsp. clavigera (Lindl.) Bytebier, endemic
 Disa obliqua (Lindl.) Bolus subsp. obliqua, endemic
 Disa obtusa Lindl. indigenous
 Disa obtusa Lindl. subsp. hottentotica H.P.Linder, endemic
 Disa obtusa Lindl. subsp. obtusa, endemic
 Disa obtusa Lindl. subsp. picta (Sond.) H.P.Linder, endemic
 Disa ocellata Bolus, endemic
 Disa oligantha Rchb.f. endemic
 Disa ophrydea (Lindl.) Bolus, endemic
 Disa oreophila Bolus, indigenous
 Disa oreophila Bolus subsp. erecta H.P.Linder, indigenous
 Disa oreophila Bolus subsp. oreophila, endemic
 Disa ovalifolia Sond. endemic
 Disa patula Sond. indigenous
 Disa patula Sond. var. patula, endemic
 Disa patula Sond. var. transvaalensis Summerh. indigenous
 Disa perplexa H.P.Linder, indigenous
 Disa physodes Sw. endemic
 Disa pillansii L.Bolus, endemic
 Disa polygonoides Lindl. indigenous
 Disa porrecta Sw. indigenous
 Disa procera H.P.Linder, endemic
 Disa pulchra Sond. indigenous
 Disa purpurascens Bolus, endemic
 Disa pygmaea Bolus, endemic
 Disa racemosa L.f. endemic
 Disa remota H.P.Linder, endemic
 Disa reticulata Bolus, endemic
 Disa rhodantha Schltr. indigenous
 Disa richardiana Lehm. ex Bolus, endemic
 Disa rosea Lindl. endemic
 Disa roseovittata McMurtry, endemic
 Disa rufescens (Thunb.) Sw. endemic
 Disa sabulosa Bolus, endemic
 Disa sagittalis (L.f.) Sw. endemic
 Disa salteri G.J.Lewis, endemic
 Disa sanguinea Sond. endemic
 Disa sankeyi Rolfe, indigenous
 Disa satyrioides (L.) Bytebier, accepted as Disa biflora (L.) Druce
 Disa saxicola Schltr. indigenous
 Disa schizodioides Sond. endemic
 Disa schlechteriana Bolus, endemic
 Disa scullyi Bolus, endemic
 Disa similis Summerh. endemic
 Disa spathulata (L.f.) Sw. indigenous
 Disa spathulata (L.f.) Sw. subsp. spathulata, endemic
 Disa spathulata (L.f.) Sw. subsp. tripartita (Lindl.) H.P.Linder, endemic
 Disa stachyoides Rchb.f. indigenous
 Disa staerkeriana McMurtry & Bytebier, endemic
 Disa stricta Sond. indigenous
 Disa subtenuicornis H.P.Linder, endemic
 Disa telipogonis Rchb.f. endemic
 Disa tenella (L.f.) Sw. indigenous
 Disa tenella (L.f.) Sw. subsp. pusilla H.P.Linder, endemic
 Disa tenella (L.f.) Sw. subsp. tenella, endemic
 Disa tenuicornis Bolus, endemic
 Disa tenuifolia Sw. endemic
 Disa tenuis Lindl. endemic
 Disa thodei Schltr. ex Kraenzl. indigenous
 Disa triloba Lindl. endemic
 Disa tripetaloides (L.f.) N.E.Br. endemic
 Disa tripetaloides (L.f.) N.E.Br. subsp. aurata (Bolus) H.P.Linder, accepted as Disa aurata (Bolus) L.T.Parker & Koop.
 Disa tysonii Bolus, indigenous
 Disa uncinata Bolus, endemic
 Disa uniflora P.J.Bergius, endemic
 Disa vaginata Harv. ex Lindl. endemic
 Disa vasselotii Bolus ex Schltr. endemic
 Disa venosa Sw. endemic
 Disa venusta Bolus, endemic
 Disa versicolor Rchb.f. indigenous
 Disa vigilans McMurtry, T.J.Edwards & Bytebier, endemic
 Disa virginalis H.P.Linder, endemic
 Disa welwitschii Rchb.f. indigenous
 Disa welwitschii Rchb.f. subsp. welwitschii, indigenous
 Disa woodii Schltr. indigenous
 Disa x brendae H.P.Linder, endemic
 Disa x nuwebergensis H.P.Linder, endemic
 Disa x paludicola J.Stewart & J.C.Manning, endemic
 Disa zimbabweensis H.P.Linder, indigenous
 Disa zuluensis Rolfe, endemic

Disperis 
Genus Disperis:
 Disperis anthoceros Rchb.f. indigenous
 Disperis anthoceros Rchb.f. var. anthoceros, indigenous
 Disperis bodkinii Bolus, endemic
 Disperis bolusiana Schltr. ex Bolus, indigenous
 Disperis bolusiana Schltr. ex Bolus subsp. bolusiana, endemic
 Disperis bolusiana Schltr. ex Bolus subsp. macrocorys (Rolfe) J.C.Manning, endemic
 Disperis capensis (L.f.) Sw. indigenous
 Disperis capensis (L.f.) Sw. var. brevicaudata Rolfe, endemic
 Disperis capensis (L.f.) Sw. var. capensis, endemic
 Disperis cardiophora Harv. indigenous
 Disperis circumflexa (L.) T.Durand & Schinz, indigenous
 Disperis circumflexa (L.) T.Durand & Schinz subsp. aemula (Schltr.) J.C.Manning, endemic
 Disperis circumflexa (L.) T.Durand & Schinz subsp. circumflexa, endemic
 Disperis concinna Schltr. endemic
 Disperis cooperi Harv. endemic
 Disperis cucullata Sw. endemic
 Disperis disaeformis Schltr. endemic
 Disperis fanniniae Harv. indigenous
 Disperis johnstonii Rchb.f. ex Rolfe, indigenous
 Disperis lindleyana Rchb.f. indigenous
 Disperis macowanii Bolus, indigenous
 Disperis micrantha Lindl. indigenous
 Disperis oxyglossa Bolus, endemic
 Disperis paludosa Harv. ex Lindl. endemic
 Disperis purpurata Rchb.f. indigenous
 Disperis purpurata Rchb.f. subsp. pallescens Bruyns, endemic
 Disperis purpurata Rchb.f. subsp. purpurata, endemic
 Disperis renibractea Schltr. endemic
 Disperis stenoplectron Rchb.f. indigenous
 Disperis thorncroftii Schltr. indigenous
 Disperis tysonii Bolus, indigenous
 Disperis villosa (L.f.) Sw. endemic
 Disperis virginalis Schltr. indigenous
 Disperis wealei Rchb.f. indigenous
 Disperis woodii Bolus, endemic

Dracomonticola 
Genus Dracomonticola:
 Dracomonticola virginea (Bolus) H.P.Linder & Kurzweil, indigenous

Eulophia 
Genus Eulophia:
 Eulophia aculeata (L.f.) Spreng. accepted as Orthochilus aculeatus (L.f.) Bytebier, indigenous
 Eulophia aculeata (L.f.) Spreng. subsp. huttonii (Rolfe) A.V.Hall, accepted as Orthochilus aculeatus (L.f.) Bytebier subsp. huttonii (Rolfe) Bytebier, indigenous
 Eulophia adenoglossa (Lindl.) Rchb.f. accepted as Orthochilus adenoglossus (Lindl.) Bytebier, indigenous
 Eulophia angolensis (Rchb.f.) Summerh. indigenous
 Eulophia barbata (Thunb.) Spreng. accepted as Acrolophia lunata (Schltr.) Schltr. & Bolus, indigenous
 Eulophia calanthoides Schltr. endemic
 Eulophia chlorantha Schltr. accepted as Orthochilus chloranthus (Schltr.) Bytebier, indigenous
 Eulophia chrysops Summerh. accepted as Eulophia schweinfurthii Kraenzl.
 Eulophia clavicornis Lindl. accepted as Eulophia hians Spreng.
 Eulophia clavicornis Lindl. var. inaequalis (Schltr.) A.V.Hall, accepted as Eulophia hians Spreng. var. inaequalis (Schltr.) S.Thomas
 Eulophia clavicornis Lindl. var. nutans (Sond.) A.V.Hall, accepted as Eulophia hians Spreng. var. nutans (Sond.) S.Thomas
 Eulophia clitellifera (Rchb.f.) Bolus, indigenous
 Eulophia cochlearis Lindl. accepted as Acrolophia cochlearis (Lindl.) Schltr. & Bolus, indigenous
 Eulophia coddii A.V.Hall, endemic
 Eulophia coeloglossa Schltr. indigenous
 Eulophia comosa Sond. accepted as Acrolophia capensis (P.J.Bergius) Fourc. indigenous
 Eulophia cooperi Rchb.f. endemic
 Eulophia cucullata (Afzel. ex Sw.) Steud. indigenous
 Eulophia ensata Lindl. accepted as Orthochilus ensatus (Lindl.) Bytebier, indigenous
 Eulophia foliosa (Lindl.) Bolus, accepted as Orthochilus foliosus (Lindl.) Bytebier, indigenous
 Eulophia fridericii (Rchb.f.) A.V.Hall, indigenous
 Eulophia hereroensis Schltr. indigenous
 Eulophia hians Spreng. indigenous
 Eulophia hians Spreng. var. hians, indigenous
 Eulophia hians Spreng. var. inaequalis (Schltr.) S.Thomas, indigenous
 Eulophia hians Spreng. var. nutans (Sond.) S.Thomas, indigenous
 Eulophia holubii Rolfe, accepted as Orthochilus holubii (Rolfe) Bytebier
 Eulophia horsfallii (Bateman) Summerh. indigenous
 Eulophia huttonii Rolfe, accepted as Orthochilus aculeatus (L.f.) Bytebier subsp. huttonii (Rolfe) Bytebier, indigenous
 Eulophia lamellata Lindl. accepted as Acrolophia lamellata (Lindl.) Pfitzer, indigenous
 Eulophia leachii Greatrex ex A.V.Hall, indigenous
 Eulophia leontoglossa Rchb.f. accepted as Orthochilus leontoglossus (Rchb.f.) Bytebier, indigenous
 Eulophia litoralis Schltr. accepted as Orthochilus litoralis (Schltr.) Bytebier, endemic
 Eulophia livingstoneana (Rchb.f.) Schltr. indigenous
 Eulophia longisepala Rendle, indigenous
 Eulophia lunata Schltr. accepted as Acrolophia lunata (Schltr.) Schltr. & Bolus, indigenous
 Eulophia macowanii Rolfe, endemic
 Eulophia meleagris Rchb.f. endemic
 Eulophia micrantha Lindl. accepted as Acrolophia micrantha (Lindl.) Pfitzer, indigenous
 Eulophia milnei Rchb.f. accepted as Orthochilus milnei (Rchb.f.) Bytebier, indigenous
 Eulophia odontoglossa Rchb.f. accepted as Orthochilus odontoglossus (Rchb.f.) Bytebier, indigenous
 Eulophia ovalis Lindl. indigenous
 Eulophia ovalis Lindl. subsp. bainesii (Rolfe) A.V.Hall, accepted as Eulophia ovalis Lindl. var. bainesii (Rolfe) P.J.Cribb & la Croix, indigenous
 Eulophia ovalis Lindl. var. bainesii (Rolfe) P.J.Cribb & la Croix, indigenous
 Eulophia ovalis Lindl. var. ovalis, indigenous
 Eulophia parviflora (Lindl.) A.V.Hall, indigenous
 Eulophia parvilabris Lindl. indigenous
 Eulophia petersii (Rchb.f.) Rchb.f. indigenous
 Eulophia platypetala Lindl. endemic
 Eulophia rosea A.D.Hawkes, accepted as Eulophia horsfallii (Bateman) Summerh.
 Eulophia schweinfurthii Kraenzl. indigenous
 Eulophia speciosa (R.Br. ex Lindl.) Bolus, indigenous
 Eulophia sphaerocarpa Sond. accepted as Acrolophia capensis (P.J.Bergius) Fourc. indigenous
 Eulophia streptopetala Lindl. indigenous
 Eulophia tabularis (L.f.) Bolus, accepted as Orthochilus tabularis (L.f.) Bytebier
 Eulophia tenella Rchb.f. indigenous
 Eulophia tristis (L.f.) Spreng. accepted as Acrolophia capensis (P.J.Bergius) Fourc. indigenous
 Eulophia tuberculata Bolus, indigenous
 Eulophia ustulata (Bolus) Bolus, accepted as Acrolophia ustulata (Bolus) Schltr. & Bolus, indigenous
 Eulophia vinosa McMurtry & McDonald, accepted as Orthochilus vinosus (McMurtry & McDonald) Bytebier
 Eulophia walleri (Rchb.f.) Kraenzl. accepted as Orthochilus walleri (Rchb.f.) Bytebier
 Eulophia welwitschii (Rchb.f.) Rolfe [1], accepted as Orthochilus welwitschii Rchb.f. indigenous
 Eulophia zeyheriana Sond. indigenous

Evotella 
Genus Evotella:
 Evotella rubiginosa (Sond. ex Bolus) Kurzweil & H.P.Linder, endemic

Gastrodia 
Genus Gastrodia:
 Gastrodia sesamoides R.Br. not indigenous, invasive

Graphorkis 
Genus Graphorkis:
 Graphorkis ensata (Lindl.) Kuntze, accepted as Orthochilus ensatus (Lindl.) Bytebier, indigenous

Habenaria 
Genus Habenaria:
 Habenaria anguiceps Bolus, endemic
 Habenaria arenaria Lindl. indigenous
 Habenaria barbertoni Kraenzl. & Schltr. endemic
 Habenaria bicolor Conrath & Kraenzl. indigenous
 Habenaria chlorotica Rchb.f. accepted as Habenaria filicornis Lindl.
 Habenaria ciliosa Lindl. endemic
 Habenaria clavata (Lindl.) Rchb.f. indigenous
 Habenaria cornuta Lindl. indigenous
 Habenaria culveri Schltr. indigenous
 Habenaria dives Rchb.f. indigenous
 Habenaria dregeana Lindl. indigenous
 Habenaria epipactidea Rchb.f. indigenous
 Habenaria falcicornis (Burch. ex Lindl.) Bolus, indigenous
 Habenaria falcicornis (Burch. ex Lindl.) Bolus subsp. caffra (Schltr.) J.C.Manning, indigenous
 Habenaria falcicornis (Burch. ex Lindl.) Bolus subsp. falcicornis, indigenous
 Habenaria filicornis Lindl. indigenous
 Habenaria galpinii Bolus, indigenous
 Habenaria humilior Rchb.f. indigenous
 Habenaria kraenzliniana Schltr. endemic
 Habenaria laevigata Lindl. endemic
 Habenaria lithophila Schltr. indigenous
 Habenaria malacophylla Rchb.f. indigenous
 Habenaria mossii (G.Will.) J.C.Manning, endemic
 Habenaria nyikana Rchb.f. indigenous
 Habenaria nyikana subsp. nyikana, indigenous
 Habenaria petitiana (A.Rich.) T.Durand & Schinz, indigenous
 Habenaria pseudociliosa Schelpe ex J.C.Manning, indigenous
 Habenaria rautaneniana Kraenzl. indigenous
 Habenaria schimperiana Hochst. ex A.Rich. indigenous
 Habenaria stenorhynchos Schltr. indigenous
 Habenaria transvaalensis Schltr. indigenous
 Habenaria tridens Lindl. indigenous
 Habenaria trilobulata Schltr. indigenous
 Habenaria tysonii Bolus, indigenous
 Habenaria woodii Schltr. endemic

Herschelianthe 
Genus Herschelianthe:
 Herschelianthe barbata (L.f.) N.C.Anthony, accepted as Disa barbata (L.f.) Sw.
 Herschelianthe baurii (Bolus) Rauschert, accepted as Disa baurii Bolus
 Herschelianthe forcipata (Schltr.) Rauschert, accepted as Disa forcipata Schltr.
 Herschelianthe forficaria (Bolus) N.C.Anthony, accepted as Disa forficaria Bolus
 Herschelianthe graminifolia (Ker Gawl. ex Spreng.) Rauschert, accepted as Disa graminifolia Ker Gawl. ex Spreng.
 Herschelianthe hians (L.f.) Rauschert, accepted as Disa hians (L.f.) Spreng.
 Herschelianthe lugens (Bolus) Rauschert, accepted as Disa lugens Bolus var. lugens
 Herschelianthe lugens (Bolus) Rauschert var. nigrescens (H.P.Linder) N.C.Anthony, accepted as Disa lugens Bolus var. nigrescens (H.P.Linder) H.P.Linder
 Herschelianthe multifida (Lindl.) Rauschert, accepted as Disa multifida Lindl.
 Herschelianthe newdigateae (L.Bolus) N.C.Anthony, accepted as Disa newdigateae L.Bolus
 Herschelianthe purpurascens (Bolus) Rauschert, accepted as Disa purpurascens Bolus
 Herschelianthe schlechteriana (Bolus) N.C.Anthony, accepted as Disa schlechteriana Bolus
 Herschelianthe spathulata (L.f.) Rauschert, accepted as Disa spathulata (L.f.) Sw.
 Herschelianthe spathulata (L.f.) Rauschert subsp. spathulata, accepted as Disa spathulata (L.f.) Sw. subsp. spathulata
 Herschelianthe spathulata subsp. tripartita (Lindl.) N.C.Anthony, accepted as Disa spathulata subsp. tripartita (Lindl.) H.P.Linder
 Herschelianthe venusta (Bolus) Rauschert, accepted as Disa venusta Bolus

Holothrix 
Genus Holothrix:
 Holothrix aspera (Lindl.) Rchb.f. endemic
 Holothrix brevipetala Immelman & Schelpe, endemic
 Holothrix burchellii (Lindl.) Rchb.f. endemic
 Holothrix cernua (Burm.f.) Schelpe, endemic
 Holothrix culveri Bolus, endemic
 Holothrix exilis Lindl. endemic
 Holothrix filicornis Immelman & Schelpe, indigenous
 Holothrix grandiflora (Sond.) Rchb.f. endemic
 Holothrix incurva Lindl. indigenous
 Holothrix longicornu G.J.Lewis, endemic
 Holothrix macowaniana Rchb.f. indigenous
 Holothrix majubensis C.Archer & R.H.Archer, endemic
 Holothrix micrantha Schltr. indigenous
 Holothrix mundii Sond. endemic
 Holothrix orthoceras (Harv.) Rchb.f. indigenous
 Holothrix parviflora (Lindl.) Rchb.f. endemic
 Holothrix pilosa (Burch. ex Lindl.) Rchb.f. endemic
 Holothrix randii Rendle, indigenous
 Holothrix schlechteriana Schltr. ex Kraenzl. endemic
 Holothrix scopularia (Lindl.) Rchb.f. indigenous
 Holothrix secunda (Thunb.) Rchb.f. endemic
 Holothrix thodei Rolfe, indigenous
 Holothrix villosa Lindl. indigenous
 Holothrix villosa Lindl. var. condensata (Sond.) Immelman, endemic
 Holothrix villosa Lindl. var. villosa, endemic

Huttonaea 
Genus Huttonaea:
 Huttonaea fimbriata (Harv.) Rchb.f. endemic
 Huttonaea grandiflora (Schltr.) Rolfe, indigenous
 Huttonaea oreophila Schltr. endemic
 Huttonaea pulchra Harv. endemic
 Huttonaea woodii Schltr. endemic

Jumellea 
Genus Jumellea:
 Jumellea filicornoides (De Wild.) Schltr. accepted as Jumellea walleri (Rolfe) la Croix
 Jumellea walleri (Rolfe) la Croix, indigenous

Limodorum 
Genus Limodorum:
 Limodorum barbatum Thunb. accepted as Acrolophia lunata (Schltr.) Schltr. & Bolus, indigenous
 Limodorum capense P.J.Bergius, accepted as Acrolophia capensis (P.J.Bergius) Fourc. indigenous
 Limodorum triste (L.f.) Thunb. accepted as Acrolophia capensis (P.J.Bergius) Fourc. indigenous

Liparis 
Genus Liparis:
 Liparis bowkeri Harv. indigenous
 Liparis capensis Lindl. endemic
 Liparis deistelii Schltr. indigenous
 Liparis odontochilos Summerh. accepted as Liparis deistelii Schltr.
 Liparis remota J.L.Stewart & Schelpe, indigenous

Margelliantha 
Genus Margelliantha:
 Margelliantha caffra (Bolus) P.J.Cribb & J.Stewart, endemic

Microcoelia 
Genus Microcoelia:
 Microcoelia aphylla (Thouars) Summerh. indigenous
 Microcoelia exilis Lindl. indigenous
 Microcoelia obovata Summerh. indigenous

Monadenia 
Genus Monadenia:
 Monadenia atrorubens (Schltr.) Rolfe, accepted as Disa atrorubens Schltr.
 Monadenia bolusiana (Schltr.) Rolfe, accepted as Disa bolusiana Schltr.
 Monadenia bracteata (Sw.) T.Durand & Schinz, accepted as Disa bracteata Sw.
 Monadenia brevicornis Lindl. accepted as Disa brevicornis (Lindl.) Bolus
 Monadenia cernua (Thunb.) T.Durand & Schinz, accepted as Disa cernua (Thunb.) Sw.
 Monadenia comosa Rchb.f. accepted as Disa comosa (Rchb.f.) Schltr.
 Monadenia conferta (Bolus) Kraenzl. accepted as Disa conferta Bolus
 Monadenia densiflora Lindl. accepted as Disa densiflora (Lindl.) Bolus
 Monadenia ecalcarata G.J.Lewis, accepted as Disa ecalcarata (G.J.Lewis) H.P.Linder
 Monadenia macrostachya Lindl. accepted as Disa macrostachya (Lindl.) Bolus
 Monadenia ophrydea Lindl. accepted as Disa ophrydea (Lindl.) Bolus
 Monadenia physodes (Sw.) Rchb.f. accepted as Disa physodes Sw.
 Monadenia pygmaea (Bolus) T.Durand & Schinz, accepted as Disa pygmaea Bolus
 Monadenia reticulata (Bolus) T.Durand & Schinz, accepted as Disa reticulata Bolus
 Monadenia rufescens (Thunb.) Lindl. accepted as Disa rufescens (Thunb.) Sw.
 Monadenia sabulosa (Bolus) Kraenzl. accepted as Disa sabulosa Bolus

Mystacidium 
Genus Mystacidium:
 Mystacidium aliceae Bolus, endemic
 Mystacidium brayboniae Summerh. endemic
 Mystacidium capense (L.f.) Schltr. indigenous
 Mystacidium flanaganii (Bolus) Bolus, endemic
 Mystacidium gracile Harv. indigenous
 Mystacidium pusillum Harv. endemic
 Mystacidium venosum Harv. ex Rolfe, indigenous

Neobolusia 
Genus Neobolusia:
 Neobolusia tysonii (Bolus) Schltr. indigenous
 Neobolusia virginea (Bolus) Schltr. accepted as Dracomonticola virginea (Bolus) H.P.Linder & Kurzweil

Nervilia 
Genus Nervilia:
 Nervilia bicarinata (Blume) Schltr. indigenous
 Nervilia crociformis (Zoll. & Moritzi) Seidenf. indigenous
 Nervilia gassneri Borge Pett. accepted as Nervilia lilacea Jum. & H.Perrier, indigenous
 Nervilia kotschyi (Rchb.f.) Schltr. indigenous
 Nervilia kotschyi (Rchb.f.) Schltr. var. purpurata (Rchb.f. & Sond.) Borge Pett. indigenous
 Nervilia lilacea Jum. & H.Perrier, indigenous
 Nervilia renschiana (Rchb.f.) Schltr. indigenous

Oberonia 
Genus Oberonia:
 Oberonia disticha (Lam.) Schltr. indigenous

Oeceoclades 
Genus Oeceoclades:
 Oeceoclades decaryana (H.Perrier) Garay & P.Taylor, indigenous
 Oeceoclades lonchophylla (Rchb.f.) Garay & P.Taylor, indigenous
 Oeceoclades mackenii (Rolfe ex Hemsl.) Garay & P.Taylor, accepted as Oeceoclades maculata (Lindl.) Lindl. indigenous
 Oeceoclades maculata (Lindl.) Lindl. indigenous

Orthochilus 
Genus Orthochilus:
 Orthochilus aculeatus (L.f.) Bytebier, indigenous
 Orthochilus aculeatus subsp. aculeatus, indigenous
 Orthochilus aculeatus (L.f.) Bytebier subsp. huttonii (Rolfe) Bytebier, indigenous
 Orthochilus adenoglossus (Lindl.) Bytebier, indigenous
 Orthochilus chloranthus (Schltr.) Bytebier, indigenous
 Orthochilus ensatus (Lindl.) Bytebier, indigenous
 Orthochilus foliosus (Lindl.) Bytebier, indigenous
 Orthochilus leontoglossus (Rchb.f.) Bytebier, indigenous
 Orthochilus litoralis (Schltr.) Bytebier, endemic
 Orthochilus odontoglossus (Rchb.f.) Bytebier, indigenous
 Orthochilus tabularis (L.f.) Bytebier, endemic
 Orthochilus vinosus (McMurtry & McDonald) Bytebier, endemic
 Orthochilus welwitschii Rchb.f. indigenous

Pachites 
Genus Pachites:
 Pachites appressa Lindl. endemic
 Pachites bodkinii Bolus, endemic

Platycoryne 
Genus Platycoryne:
 Platycoryne mediocris Summerh. indigenous

Platylepis 
Genus Platylepis:
 Platylepis glandulosa (Lindl.) Rchb.f. indigenous

Polystachya 
Genus Polystachya:
 Polystachya albescens Ridl. indigenous
 Polystachya albescens Ridl. subsp. imbricata (Rolfe) Summerh. indigenous
 Polystachya concreta (Jacq.) Garay & Sweet, indigenous
 Polystachya cultriformis (Thouars) Spreng. indigenous
 Polystachya fusiformis (Thouars) Lindl. indigenous
 Polystachya mauritiana Spreng. indigenous
 Polystachya modesta Rchb.f. indigenous
 Polystachya ngomensis G.J.McDonald & McMurtry, indigenous
 Polystachya ottoniana Rchb.f. indigenous
 Polystachya pubescens (Lindl.) Rchb.f. indigenous
 Polystachya sandersonii Harv. indigenous
 Polystachya tessellata Lindl. accepted as Polystachya mauritiana Spreng.
 Polystachya transvaalensis Schltr. indigenous
 Polystachya zambesiaca Rolfe, indigenous
 Polystachya zuluensis L.Bolus, indigenous

Pterygodium 
Genus Pterygodium:
 Pterygodium acutifolium Lindl. endemic
 Pterygodium alatum (Thunb.) Sw. endemic
 Pterygodium bicolorum (Thunb.) Schltr. endemic
 Pterygodium bifidum (Sond.) Schltr. endemic
 Pterygodium caffrum (L.) Sw. endemic
 Pterygodium catholicum (L.) Sw. endemic
 Pterygodium cleistogamum (Bolus) Schltr. endemic
 Pterygodium connivens Schelpe, endemic
 Pterygodium cooperi Rolfe, indigenous
 Pterygodium crispum (Thunb.) Schltr. endemic
 Pterygodium cruciferum Sond. endemic
 Pterygodium deflexum Bolus, endemic
 Pterygodium excisum (Lindl.) Schltr. endemic
 Pterygodium flanaganii Bolus, indigenous
 Pterygodium hallii (Schelpe) Kurzweil & H.P.Linder, endemic
 Pterygodium hastatum Bolus, indigenous
 Pterygodium inversum (Thunb.) Sw. endemic
 Pterygodium leucanthum Bolus, indigenous
 Pterygodium magnum Rchb.f. indigenous
 Pterygodium microglossum (Lindl.) Schltr. endemic
 Pterygodium newdigateae Bolus, endemic
 Pterygodium newdigateae Bolus var. cleistogamum Bolus, accepted as Pterygodium cleistogamum (Bolus) Schltr.
 Pterygodium nigrescens (Sond.) Schltr. indigenous
 Pterygodium orobanchoides (L.f.) Schltr. endemic
 Pterygodium pentherianum Schltr. endemic
 Pterygodium platypetalum Lindl. endemic
 Pterygodium schelpei H.P.Linder, endemic
 Pterygodium tricuspidatum (Bolus) Schltr. indigenous
 Pterygodium vermiferum E.G.H.Oliv. & Liltved, endemic
 Pterygodium volucris (L.f.) Sw. endemic

Rangaeris 
Genus Rangaeris:
 Rangaeris muscicola (Rchb.f.) Summerh. indigenous

Rhipidoglossum 
Genus Rhipidoglossum:
 Rhipidoglossum xanthopollinium (Rchb.f.) Schltr. indigenous

Saccolabium 
Genus Saccolabium:
 Saccolabium pachyglossa (Rchb.f.) Rolfe, accepted as Acampe pachyglossa Rchb.f. indigenous

Satyridium 
Genus Satyridium:
 Satyridium rostratum Lindl. accepted as Satyrium rhynchanthum Bolus

Satyrium 
Genus Satyrium:
 Satyrium aculeatum L.f. accepted as Orthochilus aculeatus (L.f.) Bytebier, indigenous
 Satyrium acuminatum Lindl. endemic
 Satyrium bicallosum Thunb. endemic
 Satyrium bicorne (L.) Thunb. endemic
 Satyrium bracteatum (L.f.) Thunb. endemic
 Satyrium candidum Lindl. endemic
 Satyrium capense (P.J.Bergius) Houtt. accepted as Acrolophia capensis (P.J.Bergius) Fourc. indigenous
 Satyrium carneum (Dryand.) Sims, endemic
 Satyrium coriifolium Sw. endemic
 Satyrium cristatum Sond. indigenous
 Satyrium cristatum Sond. var. cristatum, indigenous
 Satyrium cristatum Sond. var. longilabiatum A.V.Hall, indigenous
 Satyrium emarcidum Bolus, endemic
 Satyrium erectum Sw. endemic
 Satyrium eurycalcaratum Niet, endemic
 Satyrium excelsum Thunb. accepted as Disa tripetaloides (L.f.) N.E.Br.
 Satyrium foliosum Sw. endemic
 Satyrium hallackii Bolus, indigenous
 Satyrium hallackii Bolus subsp. hallackii, endemic
 Satyrium hallackii Bolus subsp. ocellatum (Bolus) A.V.Hall, indigenous
 Satyrium hians L.f. accepted as Disa hians (L.f.) Spreng.
 Satyrium humile Lindl. endemic
 Satyrium ligulatum Lindl. endemic
 Satyrium liltvedianum Niet, endemic
 Satyrium longicauda Lindl. indigenous
 Satyrium longicauda Lindl. var. jacottetianum (Kraenzl.) A.V.Hall, indigenous
 Satyrium longicauda Lindl. var. longicauda, indigenous
 Satyrium longicolle Lindl. endemic
 Satyrium lupulinum Lindl. endemic
 Satyrium macrophyllum Lindl. indigenous
 Satyrium membranaceum Sw. endemic
 Satyrium microrrhynchum Schltr. indigenous
 Satyrium muticum Lindl. endemic
 Satyrium neglectum Schltr. indigenous
 Satyrium neglectum Schltr. subsp. neglectum, indigenous
 Satyrium neglectum Schltr. subsp. neglectum var. neglectum, indigenous
 Satyrium neglectum Schltr. subsp. woodii (Schltr.) A.V.Hall, indigenous
 Satyrium odorum Sond. endemic
 Satyrium outeniquense Schltr. endemic
 Satyrium pallens S.D.Johnson & Kurzweil, endemic
 Satyrium parviflorum Sw. indigenous
 Satyrium princeps Bolus, endemic
 Satyrium pulchrum S.D.Johnson & Kurzweil, endemic
 Satyrium pumilum Thunb. endemic
 Satyrium pygmaeum Sond. endemic
 Satyrium retusum Lindl. endemic
 Satyrium rhodanthum Schltr. endemic
 Satyrium rhynchanthum Bolus, endemic
 Satyrium rupestre Schltr. ex Bolus, endemic
 Satyrium situsanguinum Niet & Liltved, endemic
 Satyrium sphaerocarpum Lindl. indigenous
 Satyrium stenopetalum Lindl. indigenous
 Satyrium stenopetalum Lindl. subsp. brevicalcaratum (Bolus) A.V.Hall, endemic
 Satyrium stenopetalum Lindl. subsp. stenopetalum, endemic
 Satyrium striatum Thunb. endemic
 Satyrium trinerve Lindl. indigenous
 Satyrium triste L.f. accepted as Acrolophia capensis (P.J.Bergius) Fourc. indigenous
 Satyrium x guthriei Bolus, endemic

Schizochilus 
Genus Schizochilus:
 Schizochilus angustifolius Rolfe, endemic
 Schizochilus bulbinella (Rchb.f.) Bolus, indigenous
 Schizochilus cecilii Rolfe, indigenous
 Schizochilus cecilii Rolfe subsp. culveri (Schltr.) H.P.Linder, indigenous
 Schizochilus cecilii Rolfe subsp. transvaalensis (Rolfe) H.P.Linder, endemic
 Schizochilus crenulatus H.P.Linder, endemic
 Schizochilus flexuosus Harv. ex Rolfe, endemic
 Schizochilus gerrardii (Rchb.f.) Bolus, endemic
 Schizochilus lilacinus Schelpe ex H.P.Linder, endemic
 Schizochilus zeyheri Sond. indigenous

Schizodium 
Genus Schizodium:
 Schizodium bifidum (Thunb.) Rchb.f. accepted as Disa bifida (Thunb.) Sw. endemic
 Schizodium cornutum (L.) Schltr. accepted as Disa biflora (L.) Druce
 Schizodium flexuosum (L.) Lindl. accepted as Disa flexuosa (L.) Sw. endemic
 Schizodium inflexum Lindl. accepted as Disa inflexa (Lindl.) Bolus, endemic
 Schizodium longipetalum Lindl. accepted as Disa longipetala (Lindl.) Bolus, endemic
 Schizodium obliquum Lindl., accepted as Disa obliqua, indigenous
 Schizodium obliquum Lindl. subsp. clavigerum (Lindl.) H.P.Linder, accepted as Disa obliqua (Lindl.) Bolus subsp. clavigera (Lindl.) Bytebier, endemic
 Schizodium obliquum Lindl. subsp. obliquum, accepted as Disa obliqua (Lindl.) Bolus subsp. obliqua, endemic
 Schizodium satyrioides (L.) Garay, accepted as Disa biflora (L.) Druce, endemic

Serapia 
Genus Serapia:
 Serapia capensis L. accepted as Acrolophia lunata (Schltr.) Schltr. & Bolus, indigenous

Serapias 
Genus Serapias:
 Serapias aculeata (L.f.) Thunb. accepted as Orthochilus aculeatus (L.f.) Bytebier, indigenous

Solenangis 
Genus Solenangis:
 Solenangis aphylla (Thouars) Summerh. accepted as Microcoelia aphylla (Thouars) Summerh. indigenous

Stenoglottis 
Genus Stenoglottis:
 Stenoglottis fimbriata Lindl. indigenous
 Stenoglottis fimbriata Lindl. subsp. fimbriata, indigenous
 Stenoglottis fimbriata Lindl. subsp. saxicola (Schltr. ex Kraenzl.) G.J.McDonald, indigenous
 Stenoglottis inandensis G.J.McDonald & D.G.A.Styles, endemic
 Stenoglottis longifolia Hook.f. endemic
 Stenoglottis macloughlinii (L.Bolus) G.J.McDonald ex J.M.H.Shaw, indigenous
 Stenoglottis modestus Truter & K.G.Joliffe, indigenous
 Stenoglottis molweniensis G.J.McDonald ex J.M.H.Shaw, endemic
 Stenoglottis woodii Schltr. indigenous
 Stenoglottis zambesiaca Rolfe, indigenous

Tridactyle 
Genus Tridactyle:
 Tridactyle bicaudata (Lindl.) Schltr. indigenous
 Tridactyle bicaudata (Lindl.) Schltr. subsp. bicaudata, indigenous
 Tridactyle bicaudata (Lindl.) Schltr. subsp. rupestris H.P.Linder, endemic
 Tridactyle gentilii (De Wild.) Schltr. indigenous
 Tridactyle tricuspis (Bolus) Schltr. indigenous
 Tridactyle tridentata (Harv.) Schltr. indigenous

Vanilla 
Genus Vanilla:
 Vanilla roscheri Rchb.f. indigenous

Hybrids 
 X Herscheliodisa vogelpoelii H.P.Linder, accepted as Disa hybrid

Ypsilopus 
Genus Ypsilopus:
 Ypsilopus erectus (P.J.Cribb) P.J.Cribb & J.L.Stewart, indigenous

Zeuxine 
Genus Zeuxine:
 Zeuxine africana Rchb.f. indigenous

References

South African plant biodiversity lists
Orchids